Bell Island may refer to:

 Bell Island (The Bahamas), and island part of the Lucayan Archipelago
 Bell Island (Newfoundland and Labrador), Canada, an island in Conception Bay
 Bell Island (Grey Islands), Canada, one of the Grey Islands, off Newfoundland's Great Northern Peninsula
 Bell Island (Alaska), U.S.
 Bell Island (Franz Josef Land), Russia
 Bell Island (New Zealand), in Waimea Inlet, part of Tasman Bay

See also
 Belle Island (disambiguation)
 Belle Isle (disambiguation)
 Belleisle (disambiguation)